Feres may refer to:
Feres, Evros, a town in the Evros regional unit, Greece
Feres, Magnesia, a town in Magnesia, Greece
Bia and Branca Feres (born 1988), Brazilian synchronized swimmers, models, actresses and identical twins

See also
Feres doctrine - see Feres v. United States